Across the Black Waters is an English novel by the Indian writer Mulk Raj Anand first published in 1939. It describes the experience of  Lalu, a sepoy in the Indian Army fighting on behalf of Britain against the Germans in France during World War I. He is portrayed by the author as an innocent peasant whose poor family was evicted from their land and who only vaguely understands what the war is about.   The book has been described  as Anand's best work since the Untouchable.
In Lalu's tragedy lied the tragedy of the Indian village and Anand dramatizes a poignant truth: to disposses any one of land is to deny him an identity.—Basavaraj Naikar
The book is part of a trilogy (along with The Village and The Sword and the Sickle) that chronicles the life of Lalu as he struggles to rise from the bottom of Indian society. In the background is India's fight for independence.
This book is the only Indian English novel that is set in World War I and portrays the experiences of Lalu, who only wants to reclaim the piece of land his family lost as a reward for serving. But when he returns from war, he finds his family destroyed and his parents dead. The novel's larger themes are that of war and death Lalu encounters Western culture.

References

External links
 
 

Novels by Mulk Raj Anand
1939 novels
Indian English-language novels
Novels set during World War I
Novels set in France